The Shaobing Song, also known as Pancake Poem or Pancake Song, is a poem purported to be written by Liu Bowen during the Ming dynasty. He supposedly presented the poem to the Hongwu Emperor.

Prophecy
The poem is named after the Chinese pastry shaobing.  It is written in cryptic form and is difficult to understand. Some believe that certain lines contain references to the future of China at the time including:
 Jingnan campaign (1399-1402)
 Tumu Crisis
 Rise of Zheng He
 Political unrest of Wei Zhongxian (魏忠贤乱政)
 Fall of the Ming dynasty and rise of the Qing dynasty
 First Opium War
 First Sino-Japanese War
 Founding of the Republic of China

Evaluations
Some Chinese researchers claimed that Pancake Poem is quite spiritual and is representative of the Chinese prophecy culture.

However, most of the work's predictions of what would happen after 1911 are too vague and inaccurate. This led some experts to believe the work is a hoax of recent production, designed to reassure people that all would be well when there was much unrest as a consequence of the Japanese invasion and the rise of communism.

See also

 I Ching
 Lingqijing
 Lo Shu Square
 Qi Men Dun Jia
 Tui bei tu, another Chinese famous prophetic text
 Tung shing
 Kau Cim
 Chinese classic texts

References

Prophecy